Eulophonotus stephania is a moth in the family Cossidae first described by Herbert Druce in 1887. It is found in Malawi, Mozambique, South Africa, Zambia and Zimbabwe.

References

Zeuzerinae
Moths of Sub-Saharan Africa